Royal Air Force Metheringham or more simply RAF Metheringham is a former Royal Air Force station situated between the villages of Metheringham and Martin and  south east of the county town Lincoln, Lincolnshire, England.

Operated as a bomber airfield during the Second World War the station opened in October 1943 and was decommissioned in the spring of 1946.

Although now mostly returned to agricultural and commercial uses the site retains one original runway, the eastern perimeter track and some contemporary buildings together with a No. 106 Squadron RAF memorial garden and a visitor centre.

History

Construction and layout
The station was planned as a Class A airfield standard layout and, although it was named Metheringham, was located largely in the adjoining parish of Martin.

One of the standard T2 hangars was placed on the technical site located alongside the B1189 road, near Linwood Grange and between runway heads 02 and 07. The second T2 hangar stood just off the east perimeter track between runway heads 25 and 31. A B1 type hangar lay north of runway head 13, near Barff Farm. The bomb dump was built around Blackthorn Holt and Fox Holt woodlands between runway heads 13 and 20.

The administration and accommodation sites were built in the south western corner of the airfield on both sides of the B1189 and consisted of an operations block, ration store, a single officers' mess, one communal other-ranks dining room, one WAAF mess, a gymnasium, four domestic accommodation blocks and a station sick quarters. Living accommodation was designed and scaled to house 1,685 males and 345 females. Many of the buildings were of the quickly erected Nissen (or Quonset) temporary hutting type.

Operations
Although the airfield building programme was far from complete, the station was soon home to No. 106 Squadron RAF.  Despite having only a single week to settle in, the Squadron was still operational in time for the opening of the Battle of Berlin, and RAF Metheringham's aircrews went to war on 18 November 1943. No. 106 Squadron and No. 110 Squadron RAF were the initial residents at Metheringham both arriving during November 1943, although No. 110 Squadron remained at Metheringham only a few weeks before relocating to RAF Waddington and before they flew any operational missions. In 1945 when hostilities ceased No. 106 Squadron had lost 65 Avro Lancaster bombers and 995 aircrew in operations flown from the airfield and other bases.

After VE-Day the Australian No. 467 Squadron RAAF arrived to train with 106 Sqn for planned Tiger Force operations against Japan in the Far East. The end of the war overtook this plan and 467 Sqn disbanded at the start of October 1945. No. 189 Squadron RAF briefly took its place, but this squadron was also soon stood down. No. 106 Squadron remained in service until February 1946 when it too was disbanded. RAF Metheringham was closed to flying and decommissioned shortly thereafter. The station was partially dismantled and the land returned to agricultural use in the early 1960s.

Victoria Cross
During a raid on Schweinfurt flown from RAF Metheringham during the night of 26–27 April 1944 the flight engineer of a 106 Squadron Lancaster, Sergeant Norman Jackson, volunteered to climb out along the wing of the aircraft in mid-flight and extinguish an engine fire started after a German fighter attack. However, after extinguishing the fire he became badly burned and was blown off the wing. Despite parachuting to safety he landed heavily and was captured, spending the rest of the war in captivity. Sergeant Jackson was awarded the Victoria Cross for his selfless act of extreme bravery in attempting to save his crew.

Fog dispersal system

Metheringham was one of a small number of RAF stations equipped with an early experimental Fog Investigation and Dispersal Operation (FIDO) system. The station was provided with seven large fuel tanks, which pumped petrol into two large pipes running up either side one of their runways. Once the open flame burners along the length of the main runway were ignited the intense rising heat would lift and disperse the fog leaving a visually clear and illuminated runway.

Not all RAF stations were FIDO equipped and when dense fog affected the county it was not unknown for aircraft from several stations to be diverted to RAF Metheringham for a safe landing, returning to their home stations when the foggy weather cleared. Volunteer observers at the surrounding Royal Observer Corps posts were specially trained and provided with coloured rocket flares (Code named Granite) to guide any aircraft lost in thick fog towards the limited number of FIDO equipped stations.

The only other airfields in Lincolnshire fitted with FIDO systems were RAF Fiskerton, RAF Ludford Magna and RAF Sturgate and there were only 15 FIDO stations in the UK, mostly on the east coast.

Station timeline and resident units

Metheringham in the media 

RAF Metheringham was utilised in the developmental testing of the experimental programme to assist aircraft landing in foggy conditions (the system eventually known by the acronym FIDO) and the station featured in the official RAF training film. Although the year of the film production is unknown, it references 21 December in relation to the system testing at Metheringham. The actual reference to RAF Metheringham in the film is brief but depicts the role that the station contributed.

Post war, museum and squadron memorial
Although the airfield site would remain fairly intact into the 1950s, its hangars and most of the domestic buildings had been demolished by 1970. The airfield itself had been sold off for farming in 1961/62 with some hardstandings removed. Parts of runways 07/25 and 13/31 were pressed into service to reinstate two minor roads that had been subsumed into the airfield in 1942. Several technical site buildings still remain in use, converted to modern commercial purposes. Some signs of this once active airfield still remain. On the original communal accommodation site south-south-west of the main airfield, near King's Covert and Westmoor Farm, many of the original buildings still stand.

The former station's ration store has now been restored and houses the Metheringham Airfield Visitor Centre, featuring an exhibition of photographs and memorabilia recalling life on an operational Second World War airfield. The visitor centre opens on Wednesday, Saturday and Sunday afternoons between the last week of March and the last week of October each year and also displays a small collection of post-war RAF jet aircraft in varying stages of restoration.

Close by are the remains of the concrete runways and perimeter tracks, and the memorial garden and plinth dedicated to No. 106 Squadron. A ghostly young lady is said to haunt the area close to the airfield.

BAC Jet Provost XS186 has been based on site since 2004, and following an extensive restoration programme it is maintained in taxiable condition by the XS186 Crew.

Gallery

References

Main Reference: Bruce Barrymore Halpenny Action Stations: Wartime Military Airfields of Lincolnshire and the East Midlands v. 2
Halpenny, Bruce Barrymore Ghost Stations Lincolnshire (Paperback)

External links

Metheringham airfield photos 2004 - 2008
Metheringham Airfield Visitor Centre
 http://www.jetprovostxs186restoration.com

Royal Air Force stations in Lincolnshire
Royal Air Force stations of World War II in the United Kingdom
Military units and formations established in 1943
Military units and formations disestablished in 1946